Multiples is a studio album by American electronic musician Keith Fullerton Whitman, released on Kranky in 2005.

Pitchfork placed it at number 36 on its list of the "Top 50 Albums of 2005".

Track listing

References

External links
 

2005 albums
Keith Fullerton Whitman albums
Kranky albums